The Ukrainian men's national tennis team represents Ukraine in Davis Cup tennis competition and are governed by the Ukrainian Tennis Federation.

History
Ukraine competed in its first Davis Cup in 1993. Ukraine currently compete in Group I of the Europe/Africa Zone . They have reached the World Group Play-offs three times.

Current squad (2022) 

 Vladyslav Orlov 
 Viacheslav Bielinskyi
 Illya Beloborodko
 Vladyslav Manafov

See also
Davis Cup
Ukraine Fed Cup team

External links

Davis Cup teams
Davis Cup
Davis Cup